Marondera High School is a co-educational high school located one and half miles from the Marondera town centre, in Mashonaland East Province, Zimbabwe. The school was established in 1960.This school is one of the first schools in Marondera. It lies opposite  Nagle House Girls High School. Previous headmasters have been Mr. Aeneas Chigwedere, Mr. Mutsigwa, Mr. Mufambisi, Mr. Chinake and Mr. Nyamayaro. The current acting headmaster is Mr. Madyangove who has just joined from St Ignatius College.

Founded in 1960 as Marandellas High School, the school catered for the Marandellas farming community and the surrounding towns. The school has five boarding houses named after English counties. The boarding houses are Cumberland (The Sables), Hampshire (The Kings) and Sussex College (The Bulls) for boys and Kent and Cornwall for girls. The school also includes day schooling with Stallion House for the girls and Tiger House(dhebhan'a) for the boys.

The school uses the symbol of the lion on its badge. The most notable event on the school calendar is the annual Chinamasa Inter-hostel rugby tournament held in the March. Cumberland, Sussex, Hampshire and the tigers go head to head where winner gets a trophy and aid to an annual celebratory braai (bbq). The tournament also serves purpose to identify and select players who go on to form the schools' Rugby first team and represent the school at the annual Dairy Board Rugby School Festival.

The games houses (Nehanda, Chitepo, Tongogara and  Mutapa) are named after popular heroes from Zimbabwe. The houses are represented with the colors red, green, yellow and blue respectively .

The school offers a variety of sports which include soccer, rugby, cricket, netball, handball, basketball, volleyball, badminton, tennis, hockey and swimming. Also included are a variety of clubs which enrich the students culturally and socially.

Notable alumni

 Graeme Hick - cricketer
 Harry Roberts (rugby player)

1965 establishments in Rhodesia
Educational institutions established in 1965
High schools in Zimbabwe
Buildings and structures in Mashonaland East Province
Education in Mashonaland East Province